The Aboriginal Protection Act 1869 was an Act of the colony of Victoria, Australia that established the Victorian Central Board for the Protection of Aborigines, to replace the Central Board Appointed to Watch Over the Interests of the Aborigines. The Act made Victoria the first colony to enact comprehensive regulations on the lives of Aboriginal Australians. The Act and subsequent regulations gave the Board extensive powers over the lives of Aboriginal Victorians, including  regulation of residence, employment, marriage, social life, custody of children and other aspects of daily life.

History
In 1860 the Victorian government established a Central Board for the Aborigines and six Aboriginal reserves under the control of managers appointed by the board. By 1869 a quarter of Aboriginal Victorians lived on reserves. Victoria enacted the Aboriginal Protection Act 1869 providing addition powers to compel Aboriginal Victorians to live on reserves. In 1871 the Board developed further controls over where Aboriginal people could live and work, what they could do, who they could meet or marry. However, by 1877 fewer than half of Aboriginal Victorians lived on reserves.

In 1886, Victoria's parliament passed what became known as the Half-Caste Act, giving the board power to expel Aboriginal Victorians of mixed heritage ("half-castes") aged from eight to 34 from reserves. According to Broome: "In one move, the Board's costs would be reduced and the Aboriginal race would vanish as the 'full bloods' aged and died, and the 'half castes' were blended to whiteness."  

The policy was implemented on the eve of the 1890s depression leading to hardship for many of those expelled from reserves. The policy was reversed by Victoria's Aborigines Act 1910, although extensive controls over the lives of Aboriginal Victorians continued.

See also
 Aboriginal Protection Board
 Half-Caste Act
 Indian Act - (Canada)

References

Further reading

History of Indigenous Australians
History of Victoria (Australia)
Victoria (Australia) legislation
1869 in Australia
Public policy in Australia
Legislation concerning indigenous peoples
1869 in law
1869 in British law
1860s in Victoria (Australia)